The Bangkok Metropolitan Council, or BMC (Thai: สภากรุงเทพมหานคร; RTGS: Sapha Krungthep Mahanakhon) is the legislative branch of the Bangkok Metropolitan Administration, the government of Bangkok. It is vested with legislative power and the duty to scrutinise the administration of the Bangkok Metropolitan Administration with the Governor of Bangkok as head of the executive.

Structure 
The Council consists of Bangkok Metropolitan Councillors (Thai: สมาชิกสภากรุงเทพมหานคร; RTGS: Samachik Sapha Krungthep Mahanakhon), who are elected directly by voters in each of Bangkok’s 50 districts. In recent elections, a district may return more than one Councillor, therefore the number of Councillors composing the BMC often fluctuates between elections. The number of Councillors to be elected per district is prescribed by the Election Commission, in accordance with the registered population in each district. 

The Council has a fixed term of 4 years, and elections are often out of sync with gubernatorial elections. The most recent elections took place on 22 May 2022. 

The current (13th) Bangkok Metropolitan Council consists of 50 Councillors. Its councillors are yet to be sworn into office as of 24 May 2022.

History 

Government of Bangkok